Shailabala Women's College (also known as S.B. Women's College) is a state run postgraduate, undergraduate and junior +2 women's government college on Madhusudan road in Cuttack, India. Shailabala Women's College is the first Women's College of Odisha.

It was named in respect for Shailabala Das who donated her home as a college building to run intermediate and degree courses. She was known for her notable deeds on contribution towards women's upliftment in education and social activities in Odisha. She was daughter of the great political leader Madhusudan Das who bought social and industrial development in Odisha during British Raj in India and is known for Utkal Divas.

The postgraduate degree master of arts (M.A) include courses on Home Science, History and Sanskrit. The undergraduate degree include Science (B.Sc) and Arts (B.A). The college is maintained by Department of Higher Education, Odisha and is affiliated to run its undergraduate and postgraduate course curriculum under Utkal University and for class 11th and 12th science, arts and some vocational courses under Council of Higher Secondary Education, Odisha.

Dr. Gayatri Biswal is the principal.

Notable alumni
 Jayanti Patnaik
 Prabhat Nalini Das
 Barsha Priyadarshini

See also
 Department of Higher Education, Odisha

References

Women's universities and colleges in Odisha
Autonomous Colleges of Odisha
Utkal University
Education in Cuttack
Educational institutions established in 1946
1946 establishments in India